Curti is a town and comune in the province of Caserta, in the Campania region of southern Italy.

Main sights

The Conocchia is a funerary monument (c. 2nd century AD) that stands on the route of the Appian Way; the name refers to its shape, which resembles a spinner's distaff. According to tradition Flavia Domitilla was buried there; she was a niece of the Roman emperor Vespasian during the Christian persecution by Domitian.

Twin towns
 Pavel Banya, Bulgaria
 Chiprana, Spain

References

Cities and towns in Campania